The Red House is a historic house in South Kingstown, Rhode Island. The main block, a -story wood-frame structure was probably built sometime in the early 18th century, and has long been a landmark in the Perryville village, receiving its name in the early 19th century. It is distinctive for period houses because of its asymmetrical facade, and was carefully restored in the late 1980s.

The house was listed on the National Register of Historic Places in 1996.

See also
National Register of Historic Places listings in Washington County, Rhode Island

References

Houses in South Kingstown, Rhode Island
Houses completed in 1732
Houses on the National Register of Historic Places in Rhode Island
National Register of Historic Places in Washington County, Rhode Island
Colonial architecture in Rhode Island